The State of Kharan was an autonomous princely state in British India covering what is part of the present-day province of Balochistan, in the southwest of Pakistan.

On 17 March 1948, Kharan acceded to Pakistan and on 3 October 1952 it joined the Baluchistan States Union. The state was dissolved on 14 October 1955 when most regions of the western wing of Pakistan were merged to form the province of West Pakistan. With the dissolution of the province in 1970, the territory was reorganised as Kharan District of the province of Baluchistan (later Balochistan).

See also
Kharan District
Balochistan Province
Baluchistan (Chief Commissioner's Province)
Makran
Las Bela
Khanate of Kalat
Baluchistan States Union
List of Indian Princely States

References

Princely states of Pakistan
Princely states of India
States and territories established in 1697
States and territories disestablished in 1955
1697 establishments in India
1955 disestablishments in Pakistan